The Betsie River is a  river in the U.S. state of Michigan. The river is mostly within Benzie County (which takes its name from a variant pronunciation of the river), although the river rises in southwest Grand Traverse County and flows briefly through northern Manistee County, Michigan.

The river widens to form Betsie Lake before emptying into Lake Michigan between Frankfort and Elberta. The Betsie River is a part of Michigan's Natural Rivers Program.

Etymology 
The name is derived from the French , meaning river of sawbill ducks (bec-scie). A corruption of this pronunciation led to the name of Benzie County. Other alternate historical names include the following:

 Aug-sig-o-sebe
 Aux Buscies River
 Betsey's River
 Black Robe River
 Gay-she-say-ing
 Riviere du Pere Marquette
 Sawbill Ducks River
 Shelldrake Ducks River

Course 
While most sources indicate the river rises as the outflow of Green Lake in southwestern Grand Traverse County, some consider it navigable immediately south of US-31 from Tullers Lake into Green Lake. Another tributary of the river flows directly out of northern Duck Lake and into northern Green Lake, connecting with the aforementioned Tullers Lake Outlet. Although not considered part of the Betsie River today, older maps of the area do say so. Green Lake straddles the boundary between Grant Township on the south and Green Lake Township on the north between Karlin and Interlochen. Several nearby lakes, including Duck Lake and its tributaries, drain into Green Lake.

The river winds southwesterly from Green Lake into eastern Benzie County, and then briefly into northern Manistee County before turning northerly back into Benzie County. A dam on the river forms Homestead Pond, after which is flows mostly west and slightly north to Lake Michigan.

Drainage basin 

Dams
 Homestead Dam  was mostly removed in 1974 and currently acts as a lamprey barrier. It impounds little water and does not impede salmon migrations. The remains of the dam are now sometimes called "Homestead Falls". The dam was a power generating facility formerly owned by Consumers Energy.
The dam was constructed in 1951 to improve waterfowl habitat and northern pike fishing. The dam was installed by the state Wildlife Division and created a  waterfowl flooding.
 Thompsonville Dam was an old power dam that failed in the spring of 1989 and was subsequently removed. Prior to its removal, the dam posed a barrier to salmon migration. Salmon and trout have access to the entire mainstream of the river, even above the Grass Lake Dam.

Bridges 
Below is a list of public crossings of the Betsie River:

Tributaries 
 Betsie Lake 
 Crystal Lake Outlet 
 Crystal Lake
Cold Creek  in Beulah

 Rice Creek 
 Dair Creek 
 Little Betsie River 
 Pickerel Creek 
 Twin Lake 
 Upper Twin Lake 
 Grass Lake 
 Mud Lake 
 Green Lake 
 Bridge Lake 
 Tullers Lake 
 Cedar Hedge Lake 
 Mud Lake 
 Duck Lake 
 Horton Creek
 Brigham Creek 
 Mason Creek 
 Weidenhamer Swamp 
 Tonawanda Lake 
 Ellis Lake 
 Saunders Lake

Notes

External links 
 Map of the Betsie River, Michigan Department of Natural Resources

Rivers of Michigan
Rivers of Benzie County, Michigan
Tributaries of Lake Michigan
Rivers of Grand Traverse County, Michigan
Rivers of Manistee County, Michigan